The NASA-ESA Mars Sample Return is a proposed Mars sample return (MSR) mission to collect Martian rock and soil samples in 43 small, cylindrical, pencil-sized, titanium tubes and return them to Earth around 2033.

The NASA–ESA plan, approved in September 2022, is to return samples using three missions: a sample collection mission (Perseverance), a sample retrieval mission (Sample Retrieval Lander + Mars Ascent Vehicle + Sample Transfer Arm + 2 Ingenuity-class helicopters), and a return mission (Earth Return Orbiter). The mission hopes to resolve the question of whether Mars once harbored life.

Although NASA and ESA's proposal is still in the design stage as of December 2022, the first leg of gathering samples is currently being executed by the Perseverance rover.

History

2001 to 2004

In the summer of 2001 the Jet Propulsion Laboratory (JPL) requested mission concepts and proposals from industry-led teams (Boeing, Lockheed Martin, and TRW). That following winter, JPL made similar requests of certain university aerospace engineering departments (MIT and the University of Michigan).

Also in 2001, a separate set of industry studies was done for the Mars ascent vehicle (MAV) due to the uniqueness and key role of the MAV for MSR. Figure 11 in this reference summarized the need for MAV flight testing at a high altitude over Earth, based on Lockheed Martin's analysis that the risk of mission failure is "extremely high" if launch vehicle components are only tested separately.

In 2003 JPL reported that the mission concepts from 2001 had been deemed too costly, which led to the study of a more affordable plan accepted by two groups of scientists, a new MSR Science Steering Group and the Mars Exploration Program Analysis Group (MEPAG). After five years of technology development, the MAV would be flight-tested twice above Earth before the mission PDR (Preliminary Design Review) in 2009.

Based on the simplified mission plan, assuming a launch from Earth in 2013 and two weeks on Mars for a 2016 return, technology development was initiated for ensuring with high reliability that potential Mars microbes would not contaminate Earth, and also that the Mars samples would not be contaminated with Earth-origin biological materials. The sample container would be clean on the outside before departing from Mars, with installation onto the MAV inside an "Earth-clean MAV garage."

In 2004 JPL published an update on the 2003 plan. MSR would use the new large skycrane landing system in development for the Mars Science Laboratory rover (later named Curiosity).  A MSR Technology Board was formed, and it was noted that the use of a rover might return to the MSR plan, in light of success with the Spirit and Opportunity rovers that arrived early in 2004.  A  ascent rocket would carry  of samples inside a  payload, the Orbiting Sample (OS).  The MAV would transmit enough telemetry to reconstruct events in case of failure on the way up to Mars orbit.

2005 to 2008

As of 2005 a rover had returned to the MSR plan, with a rock core drill in light of results from the Mars Exploration Rover discoveries. Focused technology development would start before the end of 2005 for mission PDR in 2009, followed by launch from Earth in 2013.  Related technologies in development included potential advances for Mars arrival (navigation and descent propulsion) and implementing pump-fed liquid launch vehicle technology on a scale small enough for a MAV.

In late 2005 a peer-reviewed analysis showed that ascent trajectories to Mars orbit would differ depending on liquid versus solid propulsion, largely because small solid rocket motors burn faster, requiring a steeper ascent path to avoid excess atmospheric drag, while slower burning liquid propulsion might take advantage of more efficient paths to orbit.

Early in 2006 the Marshall Space Flight Center noted the possibility that a science rover would cache the samples on Mars, then subsequently a mini-rover would be sent along with the MAV on a sample return lander, in which case either the mini-rover or the science rover would deliver the samples to the lander for loading onto the MAV. A two-stage  solid propellant MAV would be gas ejected from a launch tube with its  payload, a  diameter spherical package containing the samples.  The second stage would send telemetry and its steering thrusters would use hydrazine fuel with additives.  The authors expected the MAV to need multiple flight tests at a high altitude over Earth.

A peer-reviewed publication in 2007 described testing of autonomous sample capture for Mars orbit rendezvous. Free-floating tests were done on board a NASA aircraft using a parabolic "zero-g" flight path.

In 2007 Alan Stern, then NASA's Associate Administrator for Science, was strongly in favor of completing MSR sooner, and he asked JPL to include sample caching on the Mars Science Laboratory mission (later named Curiosity). A team at the Ames Research Center was designing a hockey puck-sized sample-caching device to be installed as an extra payload on MSL.

A review analysis in 2008 compared Mars ascent to lunar ascent, noting that the MAV would be not only technically daunting, but also a cultural challenge for the planetary community, given that lunar ascent has been done using known technology, and that science missions typically rely on proven propulsion for course corrections and orbit insertion maneuvers, similar to what Earth satellites do routinely.

2009 to 2013

Early in 2009 the In-Space Propulsion Technology project office at the NASA Glenn Research Center (GRC) presented a ranking of six MAV options, concluding that a  two-stage solid rocket with continuous telemetry would be best for delivering a  sample package to Mars orbit. A single-stage pump-fed bipropellant MAV was noted to be less heavy and was ranked second.

Later in 2009 the chief technologist of the Mars Exploration Directorate at JPL referred to a 2008 workshop on MSR technologies at the Lunar and Planetary Institute, and wrote that particularly difficult technology challenges included the MAV, sample acquisition and handling, and back planetary protection, then further commented that "The MAV, in particular, stands out as the system with highest development risk, pointing to the need for an early start" leading to flight testing before preliminary design review (PDR) of the lander that would deliver the MAV.

In October 2009 NASA and ESA established the Mars Exploration Joint Initiative to proceed with the ExoMars program, whose ultimate aim is "the return of samples from Mars in the 2020s". ExoMars's first mission was planned to launch in 2018 with unspecified missions to return samples in the 2020–2022 time frame. The cancellation of the caching rover MAX-C in 2011, and later NASA withdrawal from ExoMars, due to budget limitations, ended the mission. The pull-out was described as "traumatic" for the science community.

In 2010–2011 the NASA In-Space Propulsion Technology (ISPT) program at the Glenn Research Center received proposals and funded industry partners for MAV design studies with contract options to begin technology development, while also considering propulsion needs for Earth return spacecraft. Inserting the spacecraft into Mars orbit, then returning to Earth, was noted to need a high total of velocity changes, leading to a conclusion that solar electric propulsion could reduce mission risk by improving mass margins, compared to the previously assumed use of chemical propulsion along with aerobraking at Mars. The ISPT team also studied scenarios for MAV flight testing over Earth and recommended two flight tests prior to MSR mission PDR, considering the historical low probability of initial success for new launch vehicles.

The NASA–ESA potential mission schedule anticipated launches from Earth in 2018, 2022 and 2024 to send respectively a sample caching rover, a sample return orbiter and a sample retrieval lander for a 2027 Earth arrival, with MAV development starting in 2014 after two years of technology development identified by the MAV design studies. The ISPT program summarized a year of propulsion technology progress for improving Mars arrival, Mars ascent, and Earth return, stating that the first flight test of a MAV engineering model would need to occur in 2018 to meet the 2024 launch date for the sample retrieval lander.

The 2011 MAV industry studies were done by Lockheed-Martin teamed with ATK; Northrop-Grumman; and Firestar Technologies, to deliver a 5-kg (11-lb), 16-cm (6.3-inch) diameter sample sphere to Mars orbit. The Lockheed-Martin-ATK team focused on a solid propellant first stage with either solid or liquid propellant for the upper stage, estimated MAV mass in the range 250 to 300 kg (550 to 660 lb), and identified technologies for development to reduce mass. Northrop-Grumman (the former TRW) similarly estimated a mass below 300 kg using pressure-fed liquid bipropellants for both stages, and had plans for further progress. Firestar Technologies described a single-stage MAV design having liquid fuel and oxidizer blended together in one main propellant tank.

In early 2011 the US National Research Council's Planetary Science Decadal Survey, which laid out mission planning priorities for the period 2013–2022, declared an MSR campaign its highest priority Flagship Mission for that period. In particular, it endorsed the proposed Mars Astrobiology Explorer-Cacher (MAX-C) mission in a "descoped" (less ambitious) form. This mission plan was officially cancelled in April 2011. The plan cancelled in 2011 for budget reasons had been for NASA and ESA to each build a rover to send together in 2018.

In 2012 prospects for MSR were slowed further by a 38-percent cut in NASA's Mars program budget for fiscal year 2013, leading to controversy among scientists over whether Mars exploration could thrive on a series of small rover missions. A Mars Program Planning Group (MPPG) was convened as one response to budget cuts.

In September 2012 NASA announced its intention to further study MSR strategies as outlined by the MPPG – including a multiple launch scenario, a single-launch scenario, and a multiple-rover scenario – for a mission beginning as early as 2018. A "fetch rover" would retrieve the sample caches and deliver them to a Mars ascent vehicle (MAV). In July 2018, NASA contracted Airbus to produce a "fetch rover" concept.

In 2013 the NASA Ames Research Center proposed that a SpaceX Falcon Heavy could deliver two tons of useful payload to the Mars surface, including an Earth return spacecraft that would be launched from Mars by a one-ton single-stage MAV using liquid bipropellants fed by turbopumps. The successful landing of the Curiosity rover directly on its wheels (August 2012) motivated JPL to take a fresh look at carrying the MAV on the back of a rover. A fully guided 300-kg MAV (like Lockheed's 2011 two-stage solid) would avoid the need for a round-trip fetch rover. A smaller 150-kg MAV would permit one rover to also include sample collection while using MSL heritage to reduce mission cost and development time, placing most development risk on the MAV.  The 150-kg MAV would be made lightweight by spinning it up before stage separation, although the lack of telemetry data from the spin-stabilized unguided upper stage was noted as a disadvantage.

JPL later presented more details of the 150-kg solid propellant mini-MAV concept of 2012, in a summary of selected past efforts. The absence of telemetry data during the 1999 loss of the Mars Polar Lander had put an emphasis on "critical event communications," subsequently applied to MSR. Then after the MSL landing in 2012, requirements had been revisited with a goal to reduce MAV mass. Single fault tolerance and continuous telemetry data to Mars orbit were questioned.  For the 500 grams (1.1 lb) of samples, a 3.6-kg (7.9 lb) payload was deemed possible instead of 5 kg (11 lb). The 2012 mini-MAV concept had single-string avionics, in addition to the spin-stabilized upper stage without telemetry.

2014 to 2017

In 2014–2015 JPL analyzed many options for Mars ascent including solid, hybrid and liquid propellants, for payloads ranging from 6.5 kg to 25 kg. Four MAV concepts using solid propellant had two stages, while one or two stages were considered for hybrid and liquid propellants.  Seven options were scored for ten attributes ("figures of merit").  A single stage hybrid received the highest overall score, including the most points for reducing cost and separately for reducing complexity, with the fewest points for technology readiness.  Second overall was a single-stage liquid bipropellant MAV using electric pumps.  A pressure-fed bipropellant design was third, with the most points for technology readiness.  Solid propellant options had lower scores, partly due to receiving very few points for flexibility.  JPL and NASA Langley Research Center cautioned that the high thrust and short burn times of solid rocket motors would result in early burnout at a low altitude with substantial atmosphere remaining to coast through at high Mach numbers, raising stability and control concerns. With concurrence from the Mars Program Director, a decision was made in January 2016 to focus limited technology development funds on advancing a hybrid propellant MAV (liquid oxidizer with solid fuel).

Starting in 2015, a new effort for planetary protection moved the backward planetary protection function from the surface of Mars to the sample Return Orbiter, to "break-the-chain" in flight. Concepts for brazing, bagging, and plasma sterilization were studied and tested, with a primary focus on brazing as of 2016.

2018 to 2022

In April 2018 a letter of intent was signed by NASA and ESA that may provide a basis for a Mars sample-return mission. The agreement was dated during the 2nd International Mars Sample Return Conference in Berlin, Germany. The conference program was archived along with 125 technical submissions that covered sample science (anticipated findings, site selection, collection, curation, analysis) and mission implementation (Mars arrival, rovers, rock drills, sample transfer robotics, Mars ascent, autonomous orbit rendezvous, interplanetary propulsion, Earth arrival, planetary protection). In one of many presentations, an international science team noted that collecting sedimentary rock samples would be required to search for ancient life. A joint NASA-ESA presentation described the baseline mission architecture, including sample collection by the Mars 2020 Rover derived from the MAX-C concept, a Sample Retrieval Lander, and an Earth Return Orbiter. An alternative proposal was to use a SpaceX Falcon Heavy to decrease mission cost while delivering more mass to Mars and returning more samples. Another submission to the Berlin conference noted that mission cost could be reduced by advancing MAV technology to enable a significantly smaller MAV for a given sample payload.

In July 2019 a mission architecture was proposed. In 2019, JPL authors summarized sample retrieval, including a sample fetch rover, options for fitting 20 or 30 sample tubes into a  payload on a  single-stage-to-orbit (SSTO) MAV that would use hybrid propellants, a liquid oxidizer with a solid wax fuel, which had been prioritized for propulsion technology development since 2016. Meanwhile, the Marshall Space Flight Center (MSFC) presented a comparison of solid and hybrid propulsion for the MAV. Later in 2019, MSFC and JPL had collaborated on designing a two-stage solid propellant MAV, and noted that an unguided spinning upper stage could reduce mass, but this approach was abandoned at the time due to the potential for orbital variations.

Early in 2020 JPL updated the overall mission plan for an orbiting sample package (the size of a basketball) containing 30 tubes, showing solid and hybrid MAV options in the range . In April 2020, an updated version of the mission was presented. The decision to adopt a two-stage solid rocket MAV was followed by Design Analysis Cycle 0.0 in the spring of 2020, which refined the MAV to a  design having guidance for both stages, leading to reconsideration of an unguided spin-stabilized second stage to save mass.

Early in 2022 MSFC presented the guided-unguided MAV design for a  mass reduction and documented remaining challenges including aerodynamic complexities during the first stage burn and coast to altitude, a desire to locate hydrazine steering thrusters farther from the center of mass, and stage separation without tip-off rotation. While stage separation and subsequent spin-up would be flight tested, the authors noted that it would be ideal to flight test an entire flight-like MAV, but there would be a large cost.

In April 2022, the United States National Academies released the Planetary Science Decadal Survey report for 2023-2032, a review of plans and priorities for the upcoming ten years, after many committee meetings starting in 2020, with consideration of over 500 independently submitted white papers, more than 100 regarding Mars including comments on science and technology for sample return. The published document noted NASA's 2017 plan for a "focused and rapid" sample return campaign with essential participation from ESA, then recommended, "The highest scientific priority of NASA’s robotic exploration efforts this decade should be completion of Mars Sample Return as soon as is practicably possible."

Sample collection 

The Mars 2020 mission landed the Perseverance rover, which is storing samples to be returned to Earth later.

Mars 2020 Perseverance rover

The Mars 2020 mission landed the Perseverance rover in Jezero crater in February 2021. It collected multiple samples and packed them into cylinders for later return. Jezero appears to be an ancient lakebed, suitable for ground sampling.

At the beginning of August 2021, Perseverance made its first attempt to collect a ground sample by drilling out a finger-size core of Martian rock. This attempt did not succeed. A drill hole was produced, as indicated by instrument readings, and documented by a photograph of the drill hole. However, the sample container turned out to be empty, indicating that the rock sampled was not robust enough to produce a solid core.

A second target rock judged to have a better chance to yield a sufficiently robust sample was sampled at the end of August and the beginning of September 2021. After abrading the rock, cleaning away dust by puffs of pressurized nitrogen, and inspecting the resulting rock surface, a hole was drilled on September 1. A rock sample appeared to be in the tube, but it was not immediately placed in a container. A new procedure of inspecting the tube optically was performed. On September 6, the process was completed and the first sample placed in a container.

From December 21, 2022 Perseverance started as campaign to deposit 10 of its collected samples to the backup depot, Three Forks.

List of samples cached
Sample Tube Status

Three Forks Sample Depot
After nearly a Martian year of NASA's Perseverance Mars rover's science and sample caching operations for MSR campaign, the rover is currently tasked to deposit ten samples that it has cached from beginning at Three Forks Sample Depot as NASA aims to eventually return them to Earth starting from December 19, 2022. This depot will serve as a backup spot, in case, Perseverance cannot deliver its samples. Perseverance is depositing the samples at a relatively flat terrain known as Three Forks so that NASA and ESA could recover them in its successive missions in the MSR campaign. It is even selected as the backup landing spot for the Sample Retrieval Lander. It is a relatively benign place. It is as flat and smooth as a table top.

Perseverance's complex Sampling and Caching System takes almost an hour to retrieve the metal tube from inside the rover's belly, view it one last time with its internal Cachecam, and drop the sample ~ onto a carefully selected patch of Martian surface.

The tubes will not be piled up at a single spot. Instead, each tube-drop location will have an "area of operation" ~ in diameter. To that end, the tubes will be deposited on the surface in an intricate zigzag pattern of 10 spots for 10 tubes, with each sample ~ to ~ apart from one another near the proposed Sample retrieval lander's landing site. There are various reasons for this plan, biggest for placing them far apart being that is that sample recovery helicopters because they are designed to interact with only one tube at a time. Alongside, they will perform takeoffs and landings, and driving in that spot. To ensure a helicopter could retrieve samples without any problem, the plan to be executed properly and would span over more than two months.

Before and after Perseverance drops each tube, mission controllers will review a multitude of images from the rover's SHERLOCK Watson camera. Images by the SHERLOC WATSON camera are also used to check for surety that the tube had not rolled into the path of the rover's wheels. They also look to ensure the tube had not landed in such a way that it was standing on its end (each tube has a flat end piece called a "glove" to make it easier to be picked up by future missions). That occurred less than 5% of the time during testing with Perseverance's Earthly twin OPTIMISM in JPL's Mars Yard. In case it does happen on Mars, the mission has written a series of commands for Perseverance to carefully knock the tube over with part of the turret at the end of its robotic arm.

These SHERLOCK Watson camera images will also give the Mars Sample Return team the precise data necessary to locate the tubes in the event of the samples becoming covered by dust or sand before they are collected.Mars does get windy, but not like on Earth. But the atmosphere on Mars is 100 times less dense than that of Earth's atmosphere. So winds around here can pick up speed (fastest are Dust devils), but they don't pick up a lot of dust particles. Martian wind can certainly lift fine dust and leave it on surfaces. But even if significant dust is accumulated these images and depositing pattern will help to recover them back. Even a lucky encounter with a dust devil can even rover dust over the samples as in case with the solar panels of Spirit rover and Opportunity rover.

Once this whole task of depositing all the 10 samples is completed, Perseverance will carry on with its mission, traversing to the Crater floor and scaling Delta's summit. The rover be traversing along the edge of the crater and probably, caching more tubes then whilst following the plan of taking single sample at one rock. Till now, several pairs of samples were taken and one samples from pair will be placed at the depot and the other pair will stay on board the rover.

Sample retrieval 
The Mars Sample Return mission earlier consisted ESA Sample Fetch Rover and its associated second lander alongside the mars ascent vehicle and its lander that will take the samples to an MAV, from where they will be launched back to Earth. But after consideration and cost overruns, it was decided that given Perseverance's expected longevity, it will be the primary means of transporting samples to Sample Retrieval Lander (SRL).

Sample Retrieval Lander
The payload mass of the lander is double that of the Perseverance rover, that is ~. The lander needs to be close to the Perseverance rover to facilitate the transfer of Mars samples. It must land within  of its target site – much closer than previous Mars rovers and landers. The lander would take advantage of an enhanced version of NASA's successful Terrain Relative Navigation that helped land Perseverance safely. The new Enhanced Lander Vision System would, among other improvements, add a second camera, an altimeter, and better capabilities to use propulsion for precision landing. It is planned to land near at Three Forks in 2029. 

The Mars 2020 rover and helicopters will transport the samples to the SRL lander. SRL's ESA-built ~ long, Sample Transfer Arm will be used to extract the samples and load them into the Sample Return Capsule in the Ascent Vehicle.

Mars Sample Recovery Helicopters

MSR campaign included Ingenuity-class helicopters, both of which will be collecting the samples with the help of a tiny robotic arm to the SRL, in case perseverance rover runs into problems.

Mars Ascent Vehicle (MAV) 

Mars Ascent Vehicle (MAV) is a two-stage, solid-fueled rocket that will deliver the collected samples from the surface of Mars to the Earth Return Orbiter. Early in 2022, Lockheed Martin was awarded a contract to partner with NASA's Marshall Space Flight Center in developing the MAV and engines from Northrop Grumman. The front would be tossed a bit harder than the back, causing the rocket to point upward, toward the Martian sky. Thus, the Vertically Ejected Controlled Tip-off Release (VECTOR) system adds a slight rotation during launch, pitching the rocket up and away from the surface. MAV would enter a  orbit. It will remain stowed inside a cylinder on the SRL and will have a thermal protective coating. The rocket's first stage (SRM-1) would be burning for 75 seconds. After SRM1 burnout, the MAV will remain in a coast period for approximately 400s. During this time, the MPA aerodynamic fairing and entire first stage will separate from the vehicle. After stage separation, the second stage will initiate a spin up via side mounted small scale RCS thrusters. The entire second stage will be unguided and spin-stabilized at a rate of approximately 175 
RPM. Having achieved the target spin rate, the second stage SRM, the second stage (SRM-2) will ignite and burn for approximately 18-20s, 
raising the periapsis and circularizing the orbit. The second stage is planned to be spin-stabilized to save weight in lieu of active guidance, while the Mars samples will result in an unknown payload mass distribution. Spin Stabilization allows the rocket to be lighter, so it wouldn't have to carry active control all the way to orbit. Following 
SRM2 burnout, the second stage will coast for up to 10 
minutes while residual thrust from the SRM2 occurs. Side 
mounted small scale de-spin motors will then fire, reducing the spin rate to less than 40 RPM. Once the target orbit has been achieved, the MAV will command the MPA to eject the 
Orbiting Sample Container (OS). The spent second stage of the MAV will remain in orbit, broadcasting a hosted radio beacon signal for up to 25 days. This will aid in the capture of the OS by the ERO.

MAV is scheduled to be launched in 2028 on board the SRL lander.

Sample return

Earth Return Orbiter (ERO) 
ERO is an ESA-developed spacecraft. It includes the NASA-built Capture and Containment and Return System to rendezvous with the samples delivered by MAV in low Mars orbit (LMO).

ERO is scheduled to launch on an Ariane 64 rocket in 2027 and arrive at Mars in 2028, using ion propulsion and a separate propulsion element to gradually reach the proper orbit and then rendezvous with the orbiting sample. The MAV's second stage's radio beacon will give controllers the information they need to get the ESA Earth Return Orbiter close enough to the Orbiting Sample to see it through reflective light and capture it for return to earth. The orbiter will retrieve and seal the canisters in orbit and use a NASA-built robotic arm to place the sealed container into an Earth-entry capsule. It will raise its orbit, release the propulsion element, and return to Earth during the 2033 Mars-to-Earth transfer window.

Earth Entry Vehicle (EEV) 
The Capture/Containment and Return System (CCRS) would stow the sample in the EEV. EEV would return to Earth and land passively, without a parachute. The desert sand at the Utah Test and Training Range and shock absorbing materials in the vehicle were planned to protect the samples from impact forces. EEV is scheduled to land on Earth in 2033.

Gallery

See also 

 Timeline of Solar System exploration

Notes

References

External links 
 Mars Sample return media reel produced by NASA and JPL (video)

European Space Agency space probes
Missions to Mars
Proposed astrobiology space missions
Proposed NASA space probes